The 1934 Primera División season was the 43rd season of the professional top-flight football in Argentina. This was also the last season of the Liga Argentina de Football which finally merged with the official Association.

Boca Juniors won the dissident professional LAF title, achieving its 8th league title, while Evaristo Barrera of Racing was the topscorer.

Estudiantil Porteño won the amateur AFA championship with Pedro Maseda and Domingo Tarasconi being both topscorers with 16 goals each. Because of the merging of both leagues at the end of the season, all the amateur AFA teams were relegated.

Format and teams
The format for this season was a triple round-robin format, which was unique to this season. In order to accommodate the extra round, the number of teams was reduced from eighteen to fourteen. Six clubs were affected in the reduction of teams. Two clubs were relegated to a one-off Segunda División based on low ticket sales: Quilmes and Tigre. The remaining four clubs merged with another to form new entities which were allowed to participate this season: Talleres (BA) and Lanús merged to form Unión Talleres-Lanús; Atlanta and Argentinos Juniors merged to form Atlanta-Argentino Juniors. Atlanta-Argentinos Juniors lasted until Round 25, at which point it simply became Argentinos Juniors. Unión Talleres-Lanús lasted the entire season, but dissolved afterwards.

Final tables

Asociación Argentina de Football
Note: All teams were relegated at the end of the season following the merger of LAF and AFA.

Liga Argentina de Football

Notes

References

Argentine Primera División seasons
1934 in South American football leagues
1934 in Argentine football